Max Chapman is an Australian former professional rugby league footballer who played in the 1990s. He played for the Newcastle Knights from 1990 to 1991 and 1993.

References

External links
http://www.rugbyleagueproject.org/players/Max_Chapman/summary.html

Australian rugby league players
Newcastle Knights players
Living people
Year of birth missing (living people)
Place of birth missing (living people)
Rugby league hookers